Sigmund Søfteland (23 October 1923 – 30 July 1993) was a Norwegian speed skater who competed in the 1952 Winter Olympics and in the 1956 Winter Olympics.

He was born in Os, Hordaland and died in Bergen.

In 1952 he finished tenth in the 500 metres competition.

Four years later he finished 16th in the 500 metres event.

External links
 profile

1923 births
1992 deaths
Norwegian male speed skaters
Olympic speed skaters of Norway
Speed skaters at the 1952 Winter Olympics
Speed skaters at the 1956 Winter Olympics
People from Os, Hordaland
Sportspeople from Vestland